The Shuttle Amateur Radio Experiment (SAREX), later called the Space Amateur Radio Experiment, was a program that promoted and supported the use of amateur ("ham") radio by astronauts in low earth orbit aboard the United States Space Shuttle to communicate with other amateur radio stations around the world. It was superseded by the Amateur Radio on the International Space Station (ARISS) program. SAREX was sponsored by NASA, AMSAT (The Radio Amateur Satellite Corporation), and the ARRL (American Radio Relay League).

History

Shortly after the launch of STS-9, On November 28, 1983 Owen Garriott (W5LFL) became the first amateur radio operator active in space.  Garriott had already flown on Skylab 3, but did not operate radio equipment on that trip.  On STS-9, he used a handheld 2-meter radio, provided by the Motorola Amateur Radio Club in Fort Lauderdale, to  talk to his mother, senator Barry Goldwater (K7UGA), King Hussein of Jordan (JY1), and many others. Garriott made approximately 300 calls and convinced NASA that amateur radio was useful to get students involved in space.  Thus began the Space Amateur Radio Experiment, also known as SAREX.

The second successful use of amateur radio in space was carried out by Anthony W. England (W0ORE) on Challenger flight STS-51F in 1985. He completed 130 contacts and sent 10 images via slow-scan television. In 1991, STS-37 became the first voyage to space on which the entire crew were licensed amateur radio operators.

After these flights, amateur radios were often taken on the shuttles, as many as twenty-five before the program became known as ARISS. Licensed hams were able to participate during their free time.

Shuttles that Participated and Licensed Astronauts

Educational uses
Most amateur radio operators used SAREX to speak with licensed astronauts during their down times. SAREX, however, has been very educational for young students from kindergarten to fifth grade involved in a program similar to young astronauts, in which elementary school children learn about astronauts' daily activities and what it is like in space. Students also have had the opportunity to communicate via video when the shuttles have had suitable equipment. Teachers have found out about how to link their classes with the SAREX program through the Amateur Radio in Space Guide distributed by NASA.

Licensing

An amateur operator license is needed before operating an amateur station.  The license can be obtained from the U.S. Federal Communications Commission's (FCC) Amateur Radio Service. No special SAREX license is required for operation, but certain regulations come into play for space communications.

References

Amateur radio
Space Shuttle program